Xena: Warrior Princess is an out-of-print collectible card game by Wizards of the Coast based on the Xena: Warrior Princess television series. It was released in May 1998. The original set had 180 cards and an expansion called Battle Cry was released in September 1998 and had 75 cards. It was the second game released using the ARC System. The game is a simplified Deckmaster system with four different card types: Resource, Character, Combat, and Action. The ARC System allowed Xena: Warrior Princess to be played with C-23 and Hercules: The Legendary Journeys.

World champions

References

Card games introduced in 1998
Collectible card games
Wizards of the Coast games